Blast Beat is a 2020 American coming-of-age drama film that premiered on January 26, 2020, at the 2020 Sundance Film Festival. It is about two Colombian brothers in the US in 2000, written by Erick Castrillon and Esteban Arango and directed by Arango. It runs for 105 minutes and was acquired by Sony Pictures for distribution. It is in English and Spanish with English subtitles. There is a lot of "metal culture" and dancing in the film. It competed in the Sundance Dramatic Competition. It was released on May 21, 2021, by Vertical Entertainment.

Cast

 Moisés Arias as Mateo Andres
 Mateo Arias as Carly Andres
 Daniel Dae Kim as Dr. Michael Onitsuka
 Kali Uchis as Mafe
 Diane Guerrero as Nelly Andres
 Wilmer Valderrama as Ernesto Andres
 Andrene Ward-Hammond as Ms. Johnson

References

External links
 

2020 films
2020 drama films
American drama films
2020s Spanish-language films
American multilingual films
2020s English-language films
2020 multilingual films
2020s American films
Spanish-language American films